Joseph Anthony Schauers (May 27, 1909 – October 18, 1987) was an American rower who competed in the 1932 Summer Olympics.

In 1932 he won the gold medal as member of the American boat in the coxed pairs competition.

External links
 
 profile

1909 births
1987 deaths
American male rowers
Rowers at the 1932 Summer Olympics
Olympic gold medalists for the United States in rowing
Medalists at the 1932 Summer Olympics